Argos-Mykines is a municipality in the Argolis regional unit, Peloponnese, Greece. The seat of the municipality is the city of Argos. The municipality has an area of 1002.508 km2.

The mayor is Dimitris Kamposos, who retains his title since the formation of the municipality, having won the local elections of 2011, 2014 and 2019.

Municipality
The municipality Argos-Mykines was formed at the 2011 local government reform (known as Kallikratis) by the merger of the following 8 former municipalities, that became municipal units:
Achladokampos
Alea
Argos
Koutsopodi
Lerna
Lyrkeia
Mykines
Nea Kios

Province
The province of Argos was one of the provinces of Argolis. It had the same territory as the present municipality Argos-Mykines. It was abolished in 2006.

To the west, Argos-Mykines borders to the former municipality of Mantineia, which integrated in 2011 with the municipality of Tripoli further west. To the north are the municipalities of Sikyona, Nemea and Corinth. To the east is the municipality of Nafplio. To the south, it borders with the municipality of North Kynouria.

References

Municipalities of Peloponnese (region)
Populated places in Argolis
 
Argos 
Provinces of Greece